Latanne Rene "Tahnee" Welch (born December 26, 1961) is an American model and actress and is the daughter of the late actress Raquel Welch.

Biography
Welch was born on December 26, 1961, in San Diego, California, the daughter of actress Raquel Welch and her first husband, James Welch.

Career
Welch's film career began in Italy starring opposite Virna Lisi. She starred in Ron Howard's Cocoon and its sequel, Cocoon: The Return, in which she portrayed an alien. She played the part of Princess Rosebud in the Golan Globus adaptation of Sleeping Beauty. Returning to Europe, Welch worked mostly in Italian and German film and television productions. She appeared in American independent films I Shot Andy Warhol, Sue, and Search and Destroy. She portrayed the role of Catherine Powell in the 1996 video game Ripper.

Welch posed on the cover and a nude pictorial in the November 1995 edition of Playboy. Welch appeared in American Vogue, Italian Vogue, British GQ, Interview, French Marie Claire, Italian Moda, and German Bunte magazines.

Filmography
Amarsi un po'... (1984)
Cocoon (1985)
Sleeping Beauty (1987)
Lethal Obsession (1987)
Falcon Crest (1987-1988, 4 episodes)
Cocoon: The Return (1988)
Disperatamente Giulia (1989)
La bocca (1990)
L'angelo con la pistola (1992)
The Criminal Mind   (1993)
Night Train to Venice (1993)
Improper Conduct (1994)
Search and Destroy (1995)
I Shot Andy Warhol (1996)
Ripper (1996, interactive movie)
Johnny 2.0 (1997)
Sue (1997)
Black Light  (1999)
Body and Soul (1999)

References

External links

Living people
Actresses from San Diego
American people of Bolivian descent
American people of English descent
American female models
American film actresses
Female models from California
Hispanic and Latino American actresses
21st-century American women
1961 births